Désirée zu Hohenlohe-Langenburg (born 1980), Countess d'Ursel, also known as Désirée von Hohenlohe, is a children's clothes designer.

Early life and family 

Désirée von Hohenlohe-Langenburg is the daughter of Prince Alfonso of Hohenlohe-Langenburg and the model Heidi Balzer. On 22 September 2012 in Ronda, she married Count Thibault d'Ursel. They reside in Linterpoorten Castle in Zemst, Belgium.

Biography 

Désirée von Hohenlohe founded Les Petites Abeilles in 2013, and aimed to reintroduce more traditional designs in childrenswear. In April 2014, Prince George of Cambridge wore a smocked sailboat romper from Les Petites Abeilles during a royal visit to Australia and New Zealand. This created an instant buzz that Désirée von Hohenlohe and her husband were not prepared for, as they had no sales distribution and only a Facebook page to communicate. In March 2017, Les Petites Abeilles partnered with Yoox to launch a line of childrenswear.

References

1980 births
Living people
Desiree
Ursel
Belgian fashion designers
Belgian women fashion designers
Children's clothing designers